Arjun Yadav is an Indian first-class cricketer. He was a member of the Indian Premier League team Deccan Chargers and was also part of the 2000 Under-19 Cricket World Cup-winning India national under-19 cricket team.

He was selected as the coach of the Hyderabad cricket team, but was later sacked as the selection caused controversy.

References

Living people
1981 births
Indian cricketers
Hyderabad cricketers
Deccan Chargers cricketers
South Zone cricketers
India Blue cricketers
Cricketers from Palakkad